Todd Robert Petersen was born in Moses Lake, Washington on August 17, 1969. He is a fiction writer and an academic currently based at Southern Utah University. He and his wife Alisa have three children.

He is one of eleven writers selected by the Utah Arts Council to represent the arts in Utah education.

Writing 
Petersen's fiction has appeared in many print and online magazines. In 2007, his work was collected into the collection Long After Dark. Petersen's work is highly regarded in the Mormon Arts community where Long Before Dark has been called what "should be the model for LDS literature."

Petersen's fiction and poems have won him several awards, including the AWP Intro Award, the Marilyn Brown Novel Award, Utah Arts Award, and Sunstone Foundation awards.

Peterson was a founding editor of The Sugar Beet, an online Mormon satire zine comparable to The Onion.

His first novel Rift was released in 2009 by Zarahemla Books. It has been awarded both the Marilyn Brown Award and the Association for Mormon Letters Award for best novel of 2009.

Academics 
Petersen received his bachelors at University of Oregon, his masters at Northern Arizona University and his doctorate at Oklahoma State University. His masters and doctorate focused on creative writing. He received his PhD in 2001 and moved to SUU the same year.

His academic writing focuses on Western, Mormon, and pop-culture themes.

References

External links 
 www.toddpetersen.org

1969 births
21st-century American novelists
American Latter Day Saint writers
American male novelists
Converts to Mormonism
Living people
Northern Arizona University alumni
Oklahoma State University alumni
Southern Utah University faculty
University of Oregon alumni
Novelists from Utah
21st-century American male writers
Latter Day Saints from Washington (state)
Latter Day Saints from Oregon
Latter Day Saints from Arizona
Latter Day Saints from Oklahoma
Latter Day Saints from Utah
21st-century American non-fiction writers
American male non-fiction writers